is a Japanese professional baseball player.  He was born on March 21, 1986 in Motomiya, Fukushima, Japan.  He played two years for the Chiba Lotte Marines for three years, from 2008 to 2010, and from 2011 on, he has been playing for the Fighters.

References
http://www.baseball-reference.com/japan/player.cgi?id=nemoto001tom

Living people
1986 births
Baseball people from Fukushima Prefecture
Japanese expatriate baseball players in the United States
North Shore Honu players
Nippon Professional Baseball pitchers
Chiba Lotte Marines players
Hokkaido Nippon-Ham Fighters players